King of the Carnival (1955) is a Republic movie serial that contains a substantial amount of stock footage from the earlier Republic serial Daredevils of the Red Circle. It is the 66th and final serial produced by Republic and is often considered to be among the studio's worst. The plot concerns treasury agents investigating a Cold War counterfeiting operation believed to be connected to a circus.

Plot

Treasury agents Art Kerr and Jim Haynes are investigating a global counterfeiting operation believed to be linked to the circus. Acrobat Bert King agrees to help his old friend Art search for the counterfeiters, and his acrobatic partner June Edwards assists him. They are repeatedly threatened by two thugs, Daley and Travis.

Early evidence leads Bert and June to a cave that leads to an isolated beach and contains gear belonging to the gang. They are unaware that in a minisub off the shoreline hides Zorn, the counterfeiter who is printing the phony bills. However, the evidence points to an unknown, higher authority directing the operations, and indeed someone connected with the circus. Among the circus staff who act suspiciously are a clown named Burton and three rubes.

After several false turns, ringmaster Jess Carter is exposed as the counterfeit gang leader and Zorn's handler. Carter attempts to flee from the agents, but falls from the trapeze swing and breaks his neck. With the criminals' ringleader dead, the counterfeit operation is hastily shut down by the U.S. Treasury.

Cast

Principal players
Harry Lauter as Bert King, acrobat and former paratrooper
Fran Bennett as June Edwards, acrobat
Keith Richards as Daley, henchman
Terry Frost as Travis, henchman
Robert Shayne as Jess Carter, circus ringmaster

Supporting players
Rick Vallin as Agent Art Kerr, a T-man (Treasury agent) and former paratrooper
Robert Clarke as Agent Jim Hayes, a T-man (Treasury agent)
Gregory Gay as Zorn, agent of a foreign power
Lee Roberts as Hank

Small role players
Mauritz Hugo as Sam, Sideshow barker and henchman
Chris Mitchell as Bill
Stuart Whitman as Mac, acrobat
Tom Steele as Matt Winston, acrobat
George DeNormand as Garth

Production
King of the Carnival was budgeted at $172,995 although the final negative cost was $177,050 (a $4,055, or 2.3%, overspend). It was the cheapest Republic serial of 1955.

Under the working title King of the Circus (production number 1800), the production was filmed between March 8 and 25 of 1955; its 17 days of production marked the shortest duration of all Republic serials.

Republic would often name its films' heroes King in order to use the title "King of..." The studio had found success with this approach following the adaptation of Zane Grey's King of the Royal Mounted.

Though Republic serials traditionally employed many stuntmen, Tom Steele was the only stuntman required for the film.

The film's special effects were created by the team of Howard and Theodore Lydecker.

Release

Theatrical
King of the Carnival'''s official release date was June 27, 1955, although that is actually the date when the sixth chapter was made available to film exchanges.

This was the last new serial released by Republic. However, the studio continued with a release schedule of rereleased serials until 1958, beginning with a rerelease of Dick Tracy's G-Men and ending with Zorro's Fighting Legion.

Chapter titles
Daredevils of the Air (20:00)Death Takes the Wheel (13:20)The Trap that Failed (13:20)Operation Murder (13:20)The Mechanical Bloodhound (13:20)Undersea Peril (13:20)High Hazard (13:20)Death Alley (13:20)Cave of Doom (13:20)The Masked Executioner (13:20) (recap chapter)
Undersea Warfare (13:20)Vengeance Under the Big Top (13:20)''

See also
List of American films of 1955
 List of film serials by year
 List of film serials by studio

References

External links

1955 films
1950s crime films
American comedy thriller films
American black-and-white films
1950s English-language films
Republic Pictures film serials
Circus films
Films directed by Franklin Adreon
1950s American films